Anna Vernikov (born July 15, 2002) is an American-Israeli pair skater. With her former skating partner, Evgeni Krasnopolski, she is the 2020 Israeli national champion and competed in the final segment at the 2020 European Championships.

Personal life 
Vernikov was born on July 15, 2002 in Bridgewater Township, New Jersey.

Career

Early career 
Vernikov competed in ladies' singles for the United States, but never qualified for the U.S. Championships.

2018–2019 season 
In 2019, Vernikov teamed up with Evgeni Krasnopolski, 14 years her senior, to compete in pair skating for Israel. She had never competed the discipline prior to the partnership. In their debut international competition, the 2019 Open Ice Mall Cup, Vernikov/Krasnopolski won the bronze medal behind Croatia's Lana Petranović / Antonio Souza-Kordeiru and Zoe Jones / Christopher Boyadji of Great Britain.

2019–2020 season 
Vernikov/Krasnopolski opened their season with a tenth-place finish at 2019 CS Nebelhorn Trophy. They then won the bronze medal at the Volvo Open Cup in November. At their second Challenger, 2019 CS Golden Spin of Zagreb, Vernikov/Krasnpolski set personal bests in all segments and finished 11th overall.

In December, Vernikov/Krasnopolski won the national title at the Israeli Championships. As the only pair representing the country, they were assigned to both the 2020 European Championships and the 2020 World Championships. They qualified to the free skating and finished 13th overall at Europeans. Vernikov/Krasnopolski then competed at Challenge Cup in February, finishing in fifth. The World Championships, scheduled for March, were postponed and eventually cancelled due to the COVID-19 pandemic.

2020–2021 season 
In October, Vernikov/Krasnopolski, alongside their coaches and the Israeli national team, relocated their training base from Hackensack, New Jersey to Montclair State University in Montclair, New Jersey. They received their first-ever Grand Prix assignment, the 2020 Rostelecom Cup, but withdrew due to pandemic travel restrictions. Since assignments for the 2020–21 Grand Prix were allotted based on proximity to skaters' home country and/or training location, they were later reassigned to 2020 Skate America to replace Russia's Evgenia Tarasova / Vladimir Morozov; under normal circumstances, skaters who withdraw from a Grand Prix will not be assigned a replacement one. Vernikov/Krasnopolski finished eighth at Skate America. They placed nineteenth at the 2021 World Championships.

Programs

With Krasnopolski

Competitive highlights 
GP: Grand Prix; CS: Challenger Series

With Krasnopolski

Ladies' singles 
(for the United States)

Detailed results

References

External links 

 

2002 births
Living people
Jewish American sportspeople
Jewish Israeli sportspeople
Israeli female pair skaters
People from Bridgewater Township, New Jersey
Sportspeople from Hackensack, New Jersey
21st-century American Jews